Sanhe is a town under the administration of Pubei County, Guangxi, China. , it has 1 residential community and 8 villages under its administration.

References 

Towns of Guangxi
Pubei County